Kate Taylor Live at The Cutting Room is singer-songwriter Kate Taylor's fifth album, released in 2005.

The album is a live concert, recorded on December 10, 2004, at The Cutting Room in New York City. Tony Garnier, longtime Bob Dylan bandmember, plays bass. Also included are performances with her daughters Aquinnah and Elizabeth, the song "Sea Cruise" with niece Sally Taylor and "You Can Close Your Eyes" with Carly Simon.

Track listing

Personnel
Kate Taylor – vocals and guitar
Taylor Brown – vocals, guitar and harmonica
Tony Garnier – bass
Digital Edit/Post Production – Rich Pagano
Cover photo – Ralph Stewart
Back photo – Susan Hathaway
Design – Bill Nollman

Additional Singers
Aquinnah Witham
Elizabeth Witham
Sally Taylor
Carly Simon

Kate Taylor albums
2005 live albums